Playback Theatre is an original form of improvisational theatre in which audience or group members tell stories from their lives and watch them enacted on the spot.

History
The first Playback Theatre company was founded in 1975 by Jonathan Fox and Jo Salas.  Fox was a student of improvisational theatre, oral traditional storytelling, Jacob Moreno's psychodrama method and the work of educator Paulo Freire. Salas was a trained musician and activist. Both had served as volunteers in developing countries: Fox as a Peace Corps volunteer in Nepal, Salas with New Zealand's Volunteer Service Abroad in Malaysia.

The original Playback Theatre Company made its home in Dutchess and Ulster Counties of New York State, just north of New York City.  This group, while developing the basis of the Playback form, took it to schools, prisons, centers for the elderly, conferences, and festivals in an effort to encourage individuals from all walks of society to let their stories be heard.  They also performed monthly for the public-at-large.

The Playback Theatre idea has inspired many people.  As an immediate result of a teaching and performing tour by some of the members of the original Playback Theatre Company to Australasia in 1980, companies were founded in Sydney (1980), Melbourne (1981), Perth, and Wellington.  All four companies still exist, and are now the oldest extant companies in the world.

Since that time the form has spread throughout North America and Europe, and Playback companies now exist on six continents. The International Playback Theatre Network (IPTN) was founded in 1990 to support Playback activity throughout the world through international conferences and the IPTN Journal (formerly Interplay). As of 2018, the IPTN has 192 group members and 320 practitioner and individual members from 40 countries. 

A network was started in 2011 for people interested in Playback Theatre in North America. As of 2022, 55 active companies perform, predominantly in their local communities.  Playback North America hosts regular teleconferences, periodic gatherings, leadership coaching, and several publications, including a 300-page training guide on artistic, business, and company development for Playback Theatre (see below).
 
To meet the demand for training which this level of growth has created, in 1993 Jonathan Fox founded the School of Playback Theatre to provide beginning, intermediate and advanced levels of training in Playback Theatre. The School was renamed the Centre for Playback Theatre in 2006, expanding its focus to worldwide development of Playback Theatre. Graduates of the training program may become accredited trainers of Playback Theatre (APTTs).  

Other schools for training exist in Italy, Germany, Japan. and São Paulo, BrazilRussian School of Playback Theatre (Sondrio)</ref> Russia,
United Kingdom, Israel, Hungary, Hong Kong, Australasia and Sweden.  The Playback Centre keeps an online list of affiliated schools

Festivals and gatherings
There are regular and semi-regular Playback gatherings and festivals in different parts of the world, including in Finland, the UK, Italy, Germany, Eastern Europe, Israel, Hong Kong, Nepal and India. Playback North America, a network of playback companies in North America, has held several conferences.  The International Playback Theatre Network (IPTN) holds a conference every four years in different parts of the world. IPTN conferences have taken place in Sydney, Australia (1992), in a village north of Helsinki, Finland (1993), in Olympia, Washington, USA (1995), Perth, Australia (1997), York, England (1999), Shizuoka, Japan (2003), São Paulo, Brazil (2007), Frankfurt, Germany (2011), Montreal, Canada (2015), and Bangalore, India (2019). The next international conference will take place in South Africa in December, 2023.

Theatrical form
The Playback 'form' as developed by Fox and Salas utilizes component theatrical forms or pieces, developed from its sources in improvisational theatre, storytelling, and psychodrama. These components include scenes (also called stories or vignettes) and narrative or non-narrative short forms, including "fluid sculptures", "pairs", and "chorus".
 
In a Playback event, someone in the audience tells a moment or story from their life, chooses the actors to play the different roles, and then all those present watch the enactment, as the story "comes to life" with artistic shape and nuance. Actors draw on non-naturalistic styles to convey meaning, such as metaphor or song.

Playback performers tend to specialize in one of several roles - conductor, actor, or musician.  Some companies also have members who specialize in other roles, such as lighting.  For audiences, the active performers can seem preternaturally gifted, as they create their performances without a script or score. Following the practice of the original company, most companies do not consult or "huddle" prior to beginning the story, trusting instead to a shared understanding of the story they have heard and a readiness to respond to each other's cues.

The role of conductor, by contrast, can seem relatively easy, involving as it does conversing with the audience as a group or individually, and generally involving no acting.  However, it is recognized within the community of Playback performers as the most difficult role to fill successfully.

Applications
Playback Theatre is used in a broad range of settings: theatres and community centres (where performances take place for the general public), in schools, private sector organizations, nonprofit organizations, prisons, hospice centers, day treatment centers, at conferences of all kinds, and colleges and universities.

Playback theatre has also been used in the following fields: transitional justice, human rights, civic dialogue, refugees and immigrants, disaster recovery, climate change, birthdays, weddings, and conferences.

Education
Playback practitioners have used the method in schools on issues such as bullying (students tell stories about their experiences in relation to bullying, watch them played back, and then explore ways to create a respectful and safe school environment). Playback is used both by classroom teachers and by visiting performers/leaders.

Social change
Playback Theatre is used to provide a forum for the exchange of diverse experiences in such contexts as the aftermath of Hurricane Katrina; Martin Luther King Jr. Day celebrations examining on racial conflict and reconciliation; incarcerated men and women; immigrant and refugee organizations and their host communities; events honoring human rights.

Other examples include:

A project in Afghanistan trains victims of violence to enact each other's stories in the context of transitional justice.

A project in Melbourne, Australia trains youth to enact stories of refugee youths' experiences in the context of interactions with police; and to enact stories of police experiences in the context of interactions with refugee youth. The purpose of which is to bridge understanding between these two groups (2010, 2011).

Business
Since the mid-1990s Playback Theatre and allied techniques have increasingly been used as an effective tool in workplace training of subjects such as management and communication skills and diversity awareness.  In some cases, participants describe events which have taken place in the workplace, often events which gave rise to conflict or difficult feelings.  Playback actors "replay" the events described and the facilitator orchestrates discussion about the replay, from which many participants describe valuable learning outcomes. A workplace performance can also invite any kind of stories, from out of the work environment.

Therapy
Although Playback Theatre is not primarily a therapeutic technique, it is adaptable for use by therapists who are also trained in Playback Theatre. Clients can gain insight, catharsis, connection, and self-expression through telling their stories and participating in enacting stories of others.

See also 
 Drama Therapy
 Improvisational theatre
 Psychodrama
 Forum theatre
 True Story with Hamish & Andy

References

Further reading 
 Playback Theater Around the Globe - Anastasia Vorobyeva, 2022
 Introduction to Psychotherapeutic Playback Theater - Ronen Kowalski, 2021
 Personal Stories in Public Spaces: Essays on Playback Theatre by Its Founders - Jonathan Fox and Jo Salas, 2021
 Acts Of Service: Spontaneity, Commitment, Tradition in the Nonscripted Theatre - Jonathan Fox, 1986
 Improvising Real Life: Personal Story in Playback Theatre - Jo Salas, 1993. 20th Anniversary edition 2013. Also published in 10 translations. 
 Gathering Voices: Essays on Playback Theatre - Edited by Jonathan Fox & Heinrich Dauber, 1999
Public performance, personal story: a study of playback theatre Griffith University; Brisbane - Rea Dennis, 2004
Performing Playback Theatre (training DVD) - co-produced by the School of Playback Theatre and Hudson River Playback Theatre, 2006
 Half of My Heart/La Mitad de Mi Corazón: True Stories Told by Immigrants - Edited by Jo Salas and Leslie Gauna, 2007
 Do My Story, Sing My Song: Music therapy and Playback Theatre with troubled children - Jo Salas. Tusitala Publishing, 2008
 Savinov V. V. The Role of Conductor in Playback-Interview / V. V. Savinov // Psychodrama and modern psychotherapy. – Kyiv, Ukraine, 2012. – No. 1–2. – pp. 126–129.
 A Playback Theatre toolkit: through the lens of one company's perspective.  - Anne & Christopher Ellinger, 2018. 300-page training guide. Available through Playback North America

External links
 https://playbacktheatrenetwork.org Resources and information on the practice of Playback Theatre worldwide
 NY School of Playback Theatre NYSPT provides quality Playback Theatre training for students of all levels
 Tusitala Publishing which specializes in books about Playback Theatre
International Playback Theatre Network International Network of Playback Theatre Companies and practitioners
Playback North America network offers sharing learning and dialogue (including a Playback Toolkit and teleconferences) in the U.S. and Canada

Improvisational theatre
Theatre